Joseph Aidoo may refer to:

 Joseph Aidoo (Liberian footballer) (born 1995)
 Joseph Aidoo (Ghanaian footballer) (born 1995)
 Joseph Aidoo (politician) (born 1957), Ghanaian politician